"Fireball" is a song by American rapper Pitbull, featuring vocals from American singer John Ryan. It was released on July 23, 2014 as the second release from Pitbull's eighth studio album, Globalization (2014).

Music video
According to Variety, the music video for the song includes a "digital mashup" with internet stars Jenna Marbles (who has a large following on her YouTube comedy channel and hosts the YouTube 15 weekly program on Sirius XM, who had previously made a parody impression video of Pitbull), Bart Baker (creator behind popular music parodies, including one of Pitbull), and Brittany Furlan (the most followed female video star on Vine before Vine shut down). All three appear in the "Fireball" official video. Pitbull's collaboration with Marbles, Baker, and Furlan was brokered by Endemol Beyond USA.

Story

The video begins with Pitbull leaving a car and entering a club. The video shows people dancing in black and white, and people firebreathing, along with Marbles and Baker dancing by Pitbull. Pitbull sees a woman (Alejandra Espinoza) coming down stairs and, when she enters the main room, the video turns to color. The woman looks very much like Jessica Rabbit. Many men (usually with women) stare at her. She walks over to Pitbull; they go to a dressing room and come closer to one another. The video then ends with Pitbull and the girl leaving the club in his car.

Chart performance
The song peaked at number 23 at the US Billboard Hot 100. As of January 2015, the single has sold one million copies in the US. On October 16, 2020, the single was certified triple platinum by the Recording Industry Association of America (RIAA) for combined sales and streaming equivalent units of over three million units in the United States. It was also certified Gold in Canada and Australia.

In popular culture
The song was featured in the trailer and TV spots of Aardman Animations' Shaun the Sheep Movie. It was also featured in television spots for Walt Disney Animation Studios' Zootopia and in the Sony Pictures Animation films The Emoji Movie and The Angry Birds Movie 2.

The song was used for the opening number of Miss Earth 2014.

From 2015 to 2016, the song played every time a Colorado Rockies player hits a home run at Coors Field.

The song was featured in the pilot episode of The Catch.

It was also briefly heard in the Blue Sky Studios film Ice Age: Collision Course.

The song was used for the opening number of Miss Universe 2020.

This song has been played when the Chicago White Sox hit a home run. 

The song was adopted by Celtic FC fans, with the lyrics "Josip Juranovic, Josip Juranovic".

Charts

Weekly charts

Year-end charts

Certifications

References

2014 singles
2014 songs
Pitbull (rapper) songs
Eurodance songs
Songs written by Pitbull (rapper)
Songs written by John Ryan (musician)
Dutch Top 40 number-one singles
RCA Records singles
Songs written by Axident
Songs written by Ricky Reed
Songs written by Ilsey Juber
Songs written by Joe London
Sony Music singles